"Imagine Me, Imagine You" is a 1975 song by pop group Fox. Written by the group's founder Kenny Young, it was taken from their debut album Fox. It reached no. 15 on the UK Singles Chart in June 1975, becoming the band's third highest charting single and ultimately spending 8 weeks in the chart. However, the song reached its highest chart peak on the German chart where it reached no. 7.

A contemporary review of the song by Peter Trollope of Liverpool Echo praised lead singer Noosha's vocals and described it as "another excellent record" from "one of the best bands to have appeared on the scene in a long time". Reviewing Cherry Red's The Fox Box for Louder Than War in 2017, Ian Canty described the song as "gentle, unusual brilliance".

Track listing

7" Single

Charts

References

External links 
 Page on Discogs
 Video on YouTube

1975 songs
1975 singles
British pop songs
Funk songs
Disco songs
Songs written by Kenny Young